is a Japanese mixed martial artist and professional wrestler. He is a veteran of Shooto, PRIDE and DEEP. His specialty is a "double punch", in which he puts his hands together and throws them at his opponent.

Biography and career
Ikemoto is a former holder of the DEEP Welterweight championship, which he obtained by defeating Hidehiko Hasegawa at DEEP 36 via unanimous decision. He lost the title by dropping a unanimous decision to Yuya Shirai at DEEP 45 in January 2010.

Ikemoto was a participant in the Dream Welterweight Grand Prix and lost his first-round matchup against Marius Zaromskis by unanimous decision at Dream.8. The fight is most famous for Zaromskis backflipping onto Ikemoto, almost getting caught in a leg lock in the process.

On November 8, 2010, he made his kickboxing debut against veteran fighter Yuya Yamamoto at K-1 World MAX 2010 Final, and lost via knockout in the first round.

Ikemoto lost his retirement fight to Japanese MMA legend Ryo Chonan on April 28, 2013, at Deep: Osaka Impact 2013.

Ikemoto is occasionally a professional wrestler and had appeared for All Japan Pro Wrestling and GLEAT.

Championships and accomplishments
Deep
Deep Welterweight Championship (One time)
One Successful Title Defense

Mixed martial arts record

|-
| Loss
| align=center| 21–19–5
| Ryo Chonan
| Decision (Unanimous)
| Deep: Osaka Impact 2013
| 
| align=center| 3
| align=center| 5:00
| Tokyo, Japan
| 
|-
| Win
| align=center| 21–18–5
| Yuki Ito
| TKO (Corner Stoppage)
| Deep: Osaka Impact 2012
| 
| align=center| 2
| align=center| 2:29
| Tokyo, Japan
| 
|-
| Loss
| align=center| 20–18–5
| Mizuto Hirota
| Decision (unanimous)
| Deep: 57 Impact
| 
| align=center| 3
| align=center| 5:00
| Tokyo, Japan
| 
|-
| Win
| align=center| 20–17–5
| Hiroki Aoki
| Decision (unanimous)
| Deep: Osaka Impact
| 
| align=center| 3
| align=center| 5:00
| Osaka, Japan
| 
|-
| Win
| align=center| 19–17–5
| Naoki Matsushita
| Decision (majority)
| Deep: Cage Impact 2010 in Osaka
| 
| align=center| 3
| align=center| 5:00
| Osaka, Japan
| 
|-
| Loss
| align=center| 18–17–5
| Yuya Shirai
| Decision (unanimous)
| Deep: 45 Impact
| 
| align=center| 3
| align=center| 5:00
| Osaka, Japan
| 
|-
| Loss
| align=center| 18–16–5
| Tarec Saffiedine
| Decision (unanimous)
| DREAM.10
| 
| align=center| 2
| align=center| 5:00
| Saitama, Japan
| 
|-
| Loss
| align=center| 18–15–5
| Marius Žaromskis
| Decision (unanimous)
| DREAM.8
| 
| align=center| 2
| align=center| 5:00
| Nagoya, Japan
| 
|-
| Win
| align=center| 18–14–5
| Hidetaka Monma
| TKO (knee to the body and punches)
| Deep: 40 Impact
| 
| align=center| 1
| align=center| 1:42
| Tokyo, Japan
| 
|-
| Win
| align=center| 17–14–5
| Hidehiko Hasegawa
| Decision (unanimous)
| Deep: 36 Impact
| 
| align=center| 3
| align=center| 5:00
| Osaka, Japan
| 
|-
| Win
| align=center| 16–14–5
| Doo Won Seo
| Submission (heel hook)
| Deep: Protect Impact 2007
| 
| align=center| 1
| align=center| 2:56
| Osaka, Japan
| 
|-
| Draw
| align=center| 15–14–5
| Kiuma Kunioku
| Draw
| Deep: 32 Impact
| 
| align=center| 2
| align=center| 5:00
| Tokyo, Japan
| 
|-
| Win
| align=center| 15–14–4
| Tae Hyun Bang
| Decision (unanimous)
| Deep: 30 Impact
| 
| align=center| 3
| align=center| 5:00
| Osaka, Japan
| 
|-
| Loss
| align=center| 14–14–4
| Daisuke Nakamura
| Submission (armbar)
| Pride - Bushido 12
| 
| align=center| 1
| align=center| 3:36
| Nagoya, Japan
| 
|-
| Win
| align=center| 14–13–4
| Naoki Matsushita
| TKO (cut)
| Real Rhythm: 4th Stage
| 
| align=center| 1
| align=center| 2:26
| Osaka, Japan
| 
|-
| Loss
| align=center| 13–13–4
| Yves Edwards
| Decision (unanimous)
| Pride - Bushido 10
| 
| align=center| 2
| align=center| 5:00
| Tokyo, Japan
| 
|-
| Loss
| align=center| 13–12–4
| Jutaro Nakao
| Decision (majority)
| Real Rhythm: 3rd Stage
| 
| align=center| 3
| align=center| 5:00
| Osaka, Japan
| 
|-
| Win
| align=center| 13–11–4
| Won Jin Eoh
| KO
| Real Rhythm: 2nd Stage
| 
| align=center| 2
| align=center| 4:58
| Osaka, Japan
| 
|-
| Win
| align=center| 12–11–4
| Hidehiko Hasegawa
| Decision (unanimous)
| Deep: 20th Impact
| 
| align=center| 3
| align=center| 5:00
| Tokyo, Japan
| 
|-
| Loss
| align=center| 11–11–4
| Eddie Alvarez
| TKO (punches)
| Euphoria: USA vs The World
| 
| align=center| 2
| align=center| 4:25
| Atlantic City, New Jersey, United States
| 
|-
| Win
| align=center| 11–10–4
| Manabu Hara
| Submission (armbar)
| RED ZONE: RED ZONE 10
| 
| align=center| 1
| align=center| 1:15
| Osaka, Japan
| 
|-
| Win
| align=center| 10–10–4
| Teruhiko Kubo
| Submission (armbar)
| Deep: clubDeep Osaka
| 
| align=center| 1
| align=center| 4:58
| Osaka, Japan
| 
|-
| Win
| align=center| 9–10–4
| Motohiro Tachihara
| Submission (reverse triangle)
| RED ZONE: RED ZONE 9
| 
| align=center| 1
| align=center| 2:10
| Osaka, Japan
| 
|-
| Loss
| align=center| 8–10–4
| Shinya Aoki
| Submission (armbar)
| Deep: 15th Impact
| 
| align=center| 2
| align=center| 0:52
| Tokyo, Japan
| 
|-
| Loss
| align=center| 8–9–4
| Teruhiko Kubo
| KO
| RED ZONE: RED ZONE 8
| 
| align=center| 1
| align=center| 1:34
| Osaka, Japan
| 
|-
| Win
| align=center| 8–8–4
| Hiroki Nagaoka
| Decision (unanimous)
| Deep: 14th Impact
| 
| align=center| 3
| align=center| 5:00
| Osaka, Japan
| 
|-
| Loss
| align=center| 7-8–4
| Hidetaka Monma
| Submission (arm triangle choke)
| Deep: 13th Impact
| 
| align=center| 2
| align=center| 3:53
| Tokyo, Japan
| 
|-
| Win
| align=center| 7–7–4
| Hitoyo Kimura
| TKO (cut)
| Deep: clubDeep Osaka
| 
| align=center| 1
| align=center| 5:00
| Osaka, Japan
| 
|-
| Draw
| align=center| 6–7–4
| Yasuyuki Tokuoka
| Draw
| Shooto: Gig West 4
| 
| align=center| 2
| align=center| 5:00
| Osaka, Japan
| 
|-
| Win
| align=center| 6–7–3
| Kyosuke Sasaki
| Decision (unanimous)
| Deep: 11th Impact
| 
| align=center| 3
| align=center| 5:00
| Osaka, Japan
| 
|-
| Loss
| align=center| 5–7–3
| Akira Kikuchi
| Submission (armbar)
| Shooto 2003: 6/27 in Hiroshima Sun Plaza
| 
| align=center| 2
| align=center| 1:28
| Hiroshima, Japan
| 
|-
| Loss
| align=center| 5–6–3
| Shonie Carter
| Decision (unanimous)
| Shooto: 3/18 in Korakuen Hall
| 
| align=center| 3
| align=center| 5:00
| Tokyo, Japan
| 
|-
| Win
| align=center| 5–5–3
| Shigetoshi Iwase
| Decision (majority)
| Shooto: Gig West 3
| 
| align=center| 2
| align=center| 5:00
| Osaka, Japan
| 
|-
| Loss
| align=center| 4–5–3
| Dave Strasser
| Submission (rear naked choke)
| Shooto: Treasure Hunt 7
| 
| align=center| 1
| align=center| 3:10
| Osaka, Japan
| 
|-
| Loss
| align=center| 4–4–3
| Takuya Wada
| Decision (unanimous)
| Shooto: Treasure Hunt 3
| 
| align=center| 3
| align=center| 5:00
| Kobe, Japan
| 
|-
| Loss
| align=center| 4–3–3
| Tetsuji Kato
| Decision (unanimous)
| Shooto: To The Top Final Act
| 
| align=center| 3
| align=center| 5:00
| Urayasu, Japan
| 
|-
| Loss
| align=center| 4–2–3
| Steve Berger
| Submission (triangle armbar)
| Shooto: To The Top 7
| 
| align=center| 3
| align=center| 2:09
| Osaka, Japan
| 
|-
| Win
| align=center| 4–1–3
| Jay Buck
| TKO (punches)
| HOOKnSHOOT: Masters
| 
| align=center| 2
| align=center| 3:03
| Evansville, Indiana, United States
| 
|-
| Win
| align=center| 3–1–3
| Takayuki Okochi
| KO (knees)
| Shooto: Gig West 1
| 
| align=center| 1
| align=center| 4:01
| Osaka, Japan
| 
|-
| Win
| align=center| 2–1–3
| Damien Riccio
| TKO (punches)
| Shooto: R.E.A.D. 11
| 
| align=center| 1
| align=center| 2:09
| Tokyo, Japan
| 
|-
| Draw
| align=center| 1–1–3
| Hiroshi Tsuruya
| Draw
| Shooto: R.E.A.D. 9
| 
| align=center| 2
| align=center| 5:00
| Yokohama, Japan
| 
|-
| Loss
| align=center| 1–1–2
| Saburo Kawakatsu
| Decision (unanimous)
| Shooto: R.E.A.D. 8
| 
| align=center| 2
| align=center| 5:00
| Osaka, Japan
| 
|-
| Draw
| align=center| 1–0–2
| Takuya Wada
| Draw
| Shooto: R.E.A.D. 5
| 
| align=center| 2
| align=center| 5:00
| Tokyo, Japan
| 
|-
| Draw
| align=center| 1–0–1
| Yuji Kusu
| Draw
| Shooto: R.E.A.D. 3
| 
| align=center| 2
| align=center| 5:00
| Osaka, Japan
| 
|-
| Win
| align=center| 1–0
| Isao Tanimura
| Decision (unanimous)
| Shooto: Renaxis 5
| 
| align=center| 2
| align=center| 5:00
| Osaka, Japan
|

Kickboxing record

References

External links

1975 births
Living people
Japanese male mixed martial artists
Welterweight mixed martial artists
Mixed martial artists utilizing boxing
Mixed martial artists utilizing karate
Mixed martial artists utilizing shoot wrestling
Mixed martial artists utilizing judo
Japanese male kickboxers
Middleweight kickboxers
Japanese male judoka
Japanese male karateka
Sportspeople from Osaka Prefecture
Deep (mixed martial arts) champions
People from Matsubara, Osaka